Walcottophycus is a probable green algae with a wefty construction, known from the mid-Cambrian Burgess Shale and Kaili Formations.  Its single species, W. gyges, was originally assigned to the similar algal genus Bosworthia.

References

Fossil algae
Cambrian genus extinctions